Vasilios Borbokis (Greek: Βασίλειος Μπορμπόκης; born 10 February 1969) is a Greek former professional footballer who played as a right back. He is the younger brother of the former Greek international, Stefanos.

Club career
Born in Serres, he started his career at Apollon Kalamarias, in which he played from 1987 to 1993, when he was transferred to the then champion of Greece, AEK Athens, where played until 1997 celebrating a championship, two cups and a Super Cup.

In 1997 he was transferred to Sheffield United which was then playing in the Championship for a fee of €1.25M and became one of the first Greeks to play in England. He stayed at Sheffield United for two seasons, completing 55 appearances and scoring four goals, most notably his participation in the 1998 FA Cup semi-final against Newcastle. In this semifinal, he was faced with another Greek who was playing in England, Nikos Dabizas who was then playing in Newcastle.

In 1999 he transferred to Derby County which played in the Premier League, managing to play in the top division of England. He stayed in Derby for a year, where he played in 16 games, scoring one goal in a League Cup match against Swansea, but lost his position as a key player after a jaw injury and in December 1999 he returned to Greece for PAOK. In PAOK he played for two seasons, winning a cup during this period. In the summer of 2002 Borbokis returned to AEK where he remained for two years, which time he played seven times in the Champions League, three in the good course of the 2003–03 season and another four during the 2003–04 season.

In the 2004–05 season, Borbokis played in Cyprus with Anorthosis, with which he won the Cyprus championship, although he had an extremely small presence.

International career
Borbokis has played twice with national team of Greece during 1998.

After football
In 2009 Borbokis took over as head of scouting for AEK and four years later, in 2013, the duties of assistant coach at AEK, being the direct collaborator of his former ally in the club Traianos Dellas, remaining by his side throughout his term in the "yellow-blacks". With the resignation of the latter in October 2015, he also left, following him to Atromitos, again as his assistant.

Personal life
Borbokis hails from Mitrousi, Serres.

Honours

AEK Athens
Alpha Ethniki: 1993–94
Greek Cup: 1995–96, 1996–97
Super Cup: 1996

PAOK
Greek Cup: 2000–01

References

External links

Basil

1969 births
Association football fullbacks
Greek footballers
Living people
Footballers from Serres
Apollon Pontou FC players
AEK Athens F.C. players
Anorthosis Famagusta F.C. players
Sheffield United F.C. players
Derby County F.C. players
PAOK FC players
Premier League players
Cypriot First Division players
Greece international footballers
Greek expatriate footballers
Expatriate footballers in Cyprus
Expatriate footballers in England
Super League Greece players
AEK F.C. non-playing staff